Microcrambus hippuris is a moth in the family Crambidae. It was described by Stanisław Błeszyński in 1967. It is found in Panama.

References

Crambini
Moths described in 1967
Moths of Central America